Luigi Magni (21 March 1928 – 27 October 2013) was an Italian screenwriter and film director.

Life and career 
Born in Rome, Magni started his career as a screenwriter, in 1956, with Tempo di villeggiatura. In 1968 he collaborated with Mario Monicelli in creating a real "event" of the Italian cinema by transforming Monica Vitti into a comedic actress with The Girl with the Pistol, and the critical and commercial success of the film pushed him into directing. After the directorial debut with Faustina (which was also the debut film of Vonetta McGee), in 1969 Magni achieved an extraordinary success with Nell'anno del Signore, which was the highest-grossing Italian film of the year, so as to require for the first time in Italy nighttime screenings to meet the demands of the audience. The film marked the encounter with Nino Manfredi, with whom Magni had a long-standing association on the set (including the screenplay of Manfredi's award-winning film Per Grazia Ricevuta) and a close friendship off the set. The film also defined Magni's style, namely a commedia all'italiana mainly centred on Rome and its history, particularly the epoch between the Papal States and the Risorgimento.

In 1977 Magni achieved critical recognition with In nome del Papa Re, which also gave him his first David di Donatello Award. He received a second David di Donatello in 1995, for the screenplay of Nemici d'infanzia, and a special David di Donatello Lifetime Career Award in 2008.

In 1991 he was a member of the jury at the 17th Moscow International Film Festival. After the 2003 TV movie La notte di Pasquino, a sort of sequel of Nell'anno del Signore still with Nino Manfredi as the main actor, and with the death of Manfredi in 2004, Magni retired from cinema. He died in Rome, on 27 October 2013.

Filmography

Screenwriter
La cambiale (1959)
Il corazziere (1960)
Gli attendenti (1961)
Il mio amico Benito (1962)
In Italia si chiama amore (1963)
Un tentativo sentimentale (1964)
Le voci bianche (1964)
Extraconiugale (1964)
La Celestina P... R... (1964)
Le bambole (1965)
La Mandragola (1965)
Madamigella Di Maupin (1965)
Le fate (1966)
Non faccio la guerra, faccio l'amore (1966)
El Greco (1966)
La cintura di castità (1967)
Le streghe (1967)
Il marito è mio e l'ammazzo quando mi pare (1967)
La ragazza con la pistola (1968)
Faustina (1968)
Nell'anno del Signore (1969)
Scipione detto anche l'Africano (1971)
Per grazia ricevuta (1973)
La Tosca (1973)
La via dei babbuini (1974)
Basta che non si sappia in giro (1976)
In nome del Papa Re (1977)
Arrivano i bersaglieri (1980)
State buoni se potete (1983)
Secondo Ponzio Pilato (1987)
'o Re (1989)
In nome del popolo sovrano (1990)
Nemici d'infanzia (1995)
La Carbonara (2000)

Director
Faustina (1968)
Nell'anno del Signore (1969)
Scipione detto anche l'Africano (1971)
La Tosca (1973)
La via dei babbuini (1974)
Basta che non si sappia in giro (1976)
Quelle strane occasioni (1976)
In nome del Papa Re (1977)
Signore e signori, buonanotte (1977)
Arrivano i bersaglieri (1980)
State buoni se potete (1983)
L'addio a Enrico Berlinguer (1984)
Secondo Ponzio Pilato (1987)
Imago Urbis (1987)
'o Re (1989)
In nome del popolo sovrano (1990)
Nemici d'infanzia (1995)
Esercizi di stile (1996)
La Carbonara (2000)

References

Further reading 
 Marina Piccone, Conversazione con Luigi Magni: la vita, il cinema, la politica. Effepi Libri, 2008. .
  Franco Montini, Piero Spila, Il mondo di Luigi Magni : avventure, sogni e disincanto. Rai Eri, 2000. .

External links
 

Italian screenwriters
Italian male screenwriters
Italian film directors
1928 births
2013 deaths
David di Donatello winners
David di Donatello Career Award winners
Burials at the Cimitero Flaminio